WURC (88.1 FM), is a National Public Radio member station in Holly Springs, Mississippi, United States, owned and operated by Rust College.

External links
 Official website
 

WURC
URC
Radio stations established in 1984